Henriettea goudotiana is a species of plant in the family Melastomataceae. It is endemic to Colombia.

References

goudotiana
Endemic flora of Colombia
Endangered plants
Taxonomy articles created by Polbot
Taxa named by Charles Victor Naudin
Plants described in 1852